Eriol Merxha, also spelled as Erjol Merxha, (born 21 April 1979) is an Albanian football manager and retired player.

He played as a left midfielder for hometown club Elbasani as well as for Shkumbini and Flamurtari in the Albanian Superliga. He was also a member of the Albanian National U-21 Team during 2001.

Managerial career
Merxha was head coach of Elbasani in 2018–19.

Honours
KF Elbasani
Albanian First Division (1): 2013-14

References

External links
 Profile - FSHF

1979 births
Living people
Footballers from Elbasan
Albanian footballers
Association football midfielders
KF Elbasani players
KS Shkumbini Peqin players
KS Kastrioti players
Flamurtari Vlorë players
Kategoria Superiore players
Albanian football managers
KF Elbasani managers

Now is a coach of U-10 FK Elbasani and work at Sule Harri School 
Like a physical education teacher.